Whale Music is a 1994 Canadian comedy-drama film directed by Richard J. Lewis and starring Maury Chaykin, Cyndy Preston, and Paul Gross. It is based on the comic novel of the same name by Paul Quarrington, who also wrote the screenplay.

The film premiered at the 1994 Toronto International Film Festival.

Plot
The film stars Maury Chaykin as Desmond Howl, a former rock star who has lived in seclusion in a seaside mansion since the death of his brother Danny (Paul Gross) in a car accident. Howl spends his time composing a symphonic masterpiece for the whales who congregate in the ocean near his property. His reason for this is revealed in the title of one of his songs, "Have You Seen My Brother?" — Danny died by losing control of his car and driving off a cliff into the ocean.

One day, however, Howl awakens to find Claire (Cyndy Preston), a mysterious young woman, in his living room. Although Howl's world is disrupted, Claire ends up inspiring him to complete the symphony, to write his first great pop song in years, and to begin seeking connections with people again.

The character of Desmond Howl is based largely on Brian Wilson.

The cast also includes Kenneth Welsh, Jennifer Dale, Jim Byrnes, and Quarrington in a cameo appearance as a bartender.

Soundtrack
Music for the film was written by Rheostatics and released on the soundtrack album Music from the Motion Picture Whale Music. The song "Claire" was a Top 40 hit for the band in 1995. Quarrington had chosen the Rheostatics to compose the soundtrack because he had liked their 1992 album Whale Music, which was itself inspired by Quarrington's novel.

Reception
The film opened in eight Canadian theaters on November 4, 1994 and grossed almost $20,000 in its opening week. It went on to gross $39,129.

Awards

References

External links
Whale Music at the Internet Movie Database

1994 films
1994 comedy-drama films
Canadian comedy-drama films
English-language Canadian films
1990s English-language films
Films based on Canadian novels
Canadian rock music films
Films directed by Richard J. Lewis
1990s Canadian films